The 2021 SAFF Championship, known as Ooredoo SAFF Championship 2021 for sponsorship reasons, was the thirteenth edition of the SAFF Championship, the biennial international men's football championship of South Asia organised by South Asian Football Federation (SAFF). Initially, it was decided to be hosted by Pakistan in 2020, but was postponed to September 2021 in Bangladesh. However, the tournament was postponed again to October due to the COVID-19 pandemic, with Maldives as host.

Host selection
On 11 April 2018, SAFF decided to allow Pakistan to host the tournament after the restoration of Pakistan Football Federation's membership by FIFA and since then it would be country's first international football tournaments. However, on 15 September 2019, SAFF president Kazi Salahuddin and general secretary Anwarul Haque Helal along with representatives of seven member countries decided to host the regional tournament in Bangladesh. This was to be the last edition to be held in even years, as it was decided that the subsequent editions would be held in odd years.

However, due to the COVID-19 pandemic, the tournament was postponed from its original date of 2020 to 2021, and it was supposed to be held in September 2021. Later, Bangladesh withdrew from hosting due to the COVID-19 pandemic and lack of sponsors, after which Nepalese Prime Minister KP Sharma Oli asked All Nepal Football Association (ANFA) to "initiate the process" of hosting the tournament in Nepal. In July, the ANFA received an offer to host the tournament. Meanwhile, the Football Association of Maldives submitted their bid to host the tournament. On 9 August 2021, Maldives was declared as the hosts after an online meeting of the executive committee.

Participating nations
The Pakistan Football Federation was sanctioned by FIFA in April 2021, hence they were ineligible to participate in the competition. Bhutan initially abstained from participation as their government refused to permit the national football team to travel abroad. However, Bhutan's withdrawal was only confirmed when the fixtures were released on 18 August 2021.

Squads
For the list of squads that appeared in the tournament, see 2021 SAFF Championship squads.

Venue
The National Football Stadium in capital Malé hosted all the matches.

Officials

Referees

 Yousif Saeed Hassan
 Ammar Ashkanani 
 Majed Al-Shamrani
 Feras Taweel
 Sajëçon Zayniddinov
 Akhrol Riskullaev

Assistant Referees

 Ahmed Sabah
 Ahmed Sabah Qasim Al-Baghadi
 Yaquob Al-Mutairi
 Omar Ali Al-Jamal
 Mohamad Kazzaz
 Farhod Kuralov  
 Husniddin Shodmonov

Group stage

After the suspension of Pakistan and the withdrawal of Bhutan, the format was changed to a single group round robin format where the top two teams advance to the final.

Table

Matches

Final

Champion

Awards

Goalscorers

Prize money 
Prize money amounts were announced in 2021.

Broadcasting rights

References

2021 in Asian football
2021
Association football events postponed due to the COVID-19 pandemic
October 2021 sports events in Asia
2021 SAFF Championship
International association football competitions hosted by the Maldives